Dr. György Danis (15 June 1945 – 8 November 2012) was a Hungarian physician and politician, member of the National Assembly (MP) from SZDSZ National List between 1990 and 1998.

References

1945 births
2012 deaths
Hungarian physicians
Hungarian Democratic Forum politicians
Alliance of Free Democrats politicians
Members of the National Assembly of Hungary (1990–1994)
Members of the National Assembly of Hungary (1994–1998)
People from Tolna County